Eimeriidae is a family of Apicomplexa. It contains the following genera:
Acroeimeria Paperna & Landsberg, 1989
Alveocystis Bel'tenev, 1980
Caryospora Léger, 1904
Cyclospora Schneider, 1881
Diaspora Léger, 1898
Dorisa Levine, 1979
Eimeria Schneider, 1875
Epieimeria Dyková & Lom, 1981
Gousseffia Levine & Ivens, 1979
Hoarella Arcay de Peraza, 1963
Isospora Schneider, 1881
Mantonella Vincent, 1936
Octosporella Ray & Ragavachari, 1942
Pfeifferinella von Wasielewski, 1904
Polysporella McQuistion, 1990
Pythonella Ray & Das Gupta, 1937
Sivatoshella Ray & Sarkar, 1968

Taxonomy

The family Goussia forms a trichotomy with the Eimeriidae and Sarcocystidae.

The biliary Eimeria-like coccidia of reptiles are classified into the genus Choleoeimeria and form a sister clade to the family Eimeriidae.

References

Apicomplexa families